is a mountain peak of the Kiso Mountains range in the Chūbu region of Japan.

Geography
It is located on the border between Nakatsugawa in Gifu Prefecture and Achi in Nagano Prefecture. 

The mountain is on the list of landmark "100 Famous Japanese Mountains." The Kiso Mountains are the "Central Alps" of the scenic Japanese Alps group, located on central Honshu.

Ascents

Hiking routes
There are four hiking routes to the summit of Mount Ena, and are the: 
Kuroisawa Route (黒井沢ルート)
Misaka Pass Route (神坂峠ルート)
Hirogawara Route (広河原ルート) 
Maemiya Route (前宮ルート)

Summit views 
The Japanese Alps ranges, Mount Ontake, Mount Haku, and part of Mount Fuji can be seen from the summit of Mount Ena.

See also
Kiso Mountains
100 Famous Japanese Mountains
Before the Dawn — novel by Tōson Shimazaki.

References

External links
Enasan.net

 

Kiso Mountains
Japan Alps
Ena, Mount
Ena, Mount